Eduardo Alonso Orozco León (born 3 March 1980) is a Venezuelan actor known for his participation in telenovelas for RCTV, and most recently Venevisión. He was born in Caracas to father Eduardo Orozco who worked as a journalist and mother Coromoto Alonso.

He began his acting career at the age of seven by participating in several commercials.

Filmography

Film

Television

Theater
 Soltero, Casado , Viudo y Divorciado (2010)
 Hercules (2008)
 Alicia en el País de las maravillas (1987)

References

External links

Eduardo Orozco at Venevision.com
Eduardo Orozco actor at 

1980 births
Living people
Male actors from Caracas
Venezuelan male telenovela actors